Pedro Luis Millet Soler (born 27 May 1952) is a Spanish competitive sailor and Olympic silver medalist.

He won a silver medal in the 470 class at the 1976 Summer Olympics in Montreal, along with his partner Antonio Gorostegui.

References

1952 births
Living people
Spanish male sailors (sport)
Sailors at the 1976 Summer Olympics – 470
Olympic sailors of Spain
Olympic silver medalists for Spain
Olympic medalists in sailing
People from Barcelona

Medalists at the 1976 Summer Olympics
20th-century Spanish people